Acrolophus condita is a moth of the family Acrolophidae. It is found in South America.

References

condita
Moths described in 1914